The first Ash Wednesday fires were a series of bushfires that began in the Adelaide Hills, South Australia, on Ash Wednesday, 20 February 1980. 51 homes and 25 other buildings were destroyed, including the Anglican Christ Church, Longwood, and 75 farms were affected. 40 people were injured, with 150 left homeless.

In 1983, after the Ash Wednesday fires in February that year, the 1980 fire became known in South Australia as the "first" Ash Wednesday, or Ash Wednesday I.

References

Arson in Australia
1980 in Australia
1980
1980s in South Australia
1980 wildfires